Rugby Borough Football Club is a football club based in Rugby, Warwickshire.

History
The club were founded in 2017 "to give players from Rugby Town Juniors and its partners, a place to continue playing football in the Orange shirt into their adult years". They were placed in Division One of the Leicestershire Senior League, which they won at the first attempt, losing only three of their 31 matches with a goal difference of +168, resulting in promotion to the Premier Division. They went on to win the Premier Division title in 2018–19, but were denied promotion as their ground did not meet FA regulations. The 2018–19 season also saw the club compete in the FA Vase for the first time, defeating Malvern Town 3–2 in the first qualifying round, before losing to Bustleholme in the next round. The club ended the season by winning the Coventry Charity Cup with a 2–1 defeat of Coventry Alvis.

In 2021–22 the club were Premier Division champions again, this time earning promotion to Division One of the Spartan South Midlands League. They also won the Coventry Charity Cup for the second time, defeating Coventry Alvis 4–0 in the final.

Honours
Leicestershire Senior League
Premier Division champions 2018–19, 2021–22
Division One champions 2017–18
Coventry Charity Cup
Winners 2018–19, 2021–22

Records
Best FA Vase performance: Second qualifying round, 2018–19, 2019–20

References

External links

Football clubs in Warwickshire
Football clubs in England
Association football clubs established in 2017
2017 establishments in England
Leicestershire Senior League
Spartan South Midlands Football League
Rugby, Warwickshire